Șeitin is a commune in western Romania, located in the southwest part of Arad County, is situated in the south-western part of the Arad Plateau, in the valley of the river Mureș, and it covers approximately 6680 ha. The commune is composed of a single village, Șeitin, situated at 47 km from Arad.

Population
According to the last census, the population of the commune consists of about 2996 inhabitants, out of which 93.7% are Romanians, 0.9% Hungarians, 3.9% Roms, 0.7% Slovaks, 0.5% Ukrainians and 0.3% are of other or undeclared nationalities.

History
Șeitin was first mentioned in documents in 1138. Archaeological excavations performed in the place called "La Imaș" have discovered traces of a Dacian-Roman settlement and a burial vault that prove the continuity of inhabitance on this area.

Economy
The economy of the commune is mainly agrarian, and the locality is well known in the region as an important grain-bearing vegetable-growing place. Livestock-breeding is based on pig and cattle raising.

Tourism
The natural park called "Lunca Mureșului" and the Mureș valley are the main sights of the commune.

Natives
 Ioan T. Morar (b. 1956), journalist, poet, dramatist, novelist, literary and art critic, and civil society activist.

References

Communes in Arad County
Localities in Crișana